Steven Franciscus (born 21 August 1982) is a former Papua New Guinea rugby league player who for played the Canberra Raiders in the NRL. He had also played for the Papua New Guinea national rugby league team.

He was named in the Papua New Guinea training squad for the 2008 Rugby League World Cup but did not make the final side.

He has represented Queensland for under 19's, the Queensland Rangers and 47th Battalion side in the Toowoomba Rugby League.

He currently plays for the Dalby Diehards in Dalby Queensland and lives with his wife, Naomi and their three children.

References

1982 births
Living people
Expatriate rugby league players in Australia
Papua New Guinea national rugby league team players
Papua New Guinean expatriate rugby league players
Papua New Guinean expatriate sportspeople in Australia
Papua New Guinean rugby league players
Papua New Guinean sportsmen